Events from the year 1983 in Michigan.

The Associated Press (AP) selected the state's top news stories as follows:
 A 38% increase in Michigan's income tax led to recall campaigns against state legislators;
 Dioxins were discovered in Michigan's waterways and fish;
 Chrysler Corporation returned to financial health;
 Agnes Mary Mansour, a Roman Catholic nun and director of the Michigan Department of Social Services, quit her order in defiance of a directive from the Vatican that she quit her government job which required her to oversee the use of public funds for abortions;
 Toxic waste near Swartz Creek, Michigan, required evacuation of locals pending cleanup;
 The case of Judy Stiver triggers a controversy over her surrogate mother arrangements;
 Amway and a Canadian subsidiary pled guilty to fraud charges brought by the Canadian government for allegedly using dummy invoices showing lower values to reduce customs duties paid for goods shipped to Canada;
 In continuing fallout from the Michigan PBB contamination scandal, a bankruptcy court approved the reorganization of the Farm Services Bureau;
 (tie) Construction began on the Project ELF military antenna; and 
 (tie) The racially motivated Murder of Vincent Chin, a Chinese American, as a result of being beaten with a baseball bat by a Chrysler plant superintendent Ronald Ebens and his stepson.

Office holders

State office holders

 Governor of Michigan: James Blanchard (Democrat)
 Lieutenant Governor of Michigan: Martha Griffiths (Democrat) 
 Michigan Attorney General: Frank J. Kelley (Democrat)
 Michigan Secretary of State: Richard H. Austin (Democrat)
 Speaker of the Michigan House of Representatives: Gary Owen (Democrat)
 Majority Leader of the Michigan Senate: William Faust (Democrat)
 Chief Justice, Michigan Supreme Court:

Mayors of major cities
 Mayor of Detroit: Coleman Young
 Mayor of Grand Rapids: Abe L. Drasin
 Mayor of Flint: James W. Rutherford/James A. Sharp, Jr.
 Mayor of Lansing: Terry John McKane
 Mayor of Ann Arbor: Louis Belcher (Republican)

Federal office holders

 U.S. Senator from Michigan: Donald W. Riegle Jr. (Democrat)
 U.S. Senator from Michigan: Carl Levin (Democrat) 
 House District 1: John Conyers (Democrat)
 House District 2: Carl Pursell (Republican)
 House District 3: Howard Wolpe (Republican)
 House District 4: Mark D. Siljander (Republican)
 House District 5: Harold S. Sawyer (Republican)
 House District 6: Bob Dunn (Democrat)
 House District 7: Dale Kildee (Democrat)
 House District 8: J. Bob Traxler (Democrat)
 House District 9: Guy Vander Jagt (Republican)
 House District 10: Donald J. Albosta (Democrat)
 House District 11: Robert William Davis (Republican)
 House District 12: David Bonior (Democrat)
 House District 13: George Crockett Jr. (Democrat)
 House District 14: Dennis M. Hertel (Democrat)
 House District 15: William D. Ford (Democrat)
 House District 16: John Dingell (Democrat)
 House District 17: Sander Levin (Democrat)
 House District 18: William Broomfield (Republican)
 House District 19: Seat lost after 1980 U.S. Census

Population

Sports

Baseball
 1983 Detroit Tigers season – Under manager Sparky Anderson, the Tigers compiled a 92-70 record and finished second in the American League East. The team's statistical leaders included Lou Whitaker with a .320 batting average, Lance Parrish with 27 home runs and 114 RBIs, Jack Morris with 20 wins, and Aurelio Lopez with a 2.81 earned run average (ERA).

American football
 1983 Detroit Lions season – The Lions, under head coach Monte Clark, compiled a 9–7 record and finished first in the NFC Central Division. The team's statistical leaders included Eric Hipple with 2,577 passing yards, Billy Sims with 1,040 rushing yards, Leonard Thompson with 752 receiving yards, and Eddie Murray with 113 points scored.
 1983 Michigan Wolverines football team – Under head coach Bo Schembechler, the Wolverines compiled a 9–3 record. The team's statistical leaders included Steve Smith with 1,420 passing yards, Rick Rogers with 1,002 rushing yards, Sim Nelson with 494 receiving yards, and Bob Bergeron with 76 points scored.

Basketball
 1982–83 Detroit Pistons season – Under head coach Scotty Robertson, the Pistons compiled a 37–45 record and finished third in the NBA's Central Division. The team's statistical leaders included Isiah Thomas with 1,854 points and 634 assists and Bill Laimbeer with 993 rebounds.

Ice hockey
 1982–83 Detroit Red Wings season –  Under head coach Nick Polano, the Red Wings compiled a 21–44–15 record and finished sixth in the National Hockey League's Norris Division. The team's statistical leaders included John Ogrodnick with 41 assists and 85 points and Reed Larson with 52 assists. The team's regular goaltenders were Corrado Micalef, Greg Stefan, and Gilles Gilbert.

Boxing

Other

Music and culture
 Madonna, the debut album from Madonna, was released in July 1983. It included the hit singles "Holiday", "Lucky Star", and "Borderline".
 "Old Time Rock and Roll" by Bob Seger, originally released in 1979, appeared in the film Risky Business starring Tom Cruise, released in August 1983, and became a hit.

Chronology of events

Births
 February 21 - Braylon Edwards, American football wide receiver, in Detroit

Gallery of 1983 births

Deaths
 March 4 - Jim Pace, running back at Michigan and Big Ten MVP (1957), at age 80 in Culver City, California
 March 6 - John MacInnes, hockey coach at Michigan Tech (1956-1982) and 3x NCAA champion, at age 57 in Houghton, Michigan
 May - Ernie McCoy
 June 15 - Elmer Mitchell
 July 8 - Vic Wertz, baseball player, at age 58 in Detroit
 July 28 - Elizabeth C. Crosby
 August 20 - Alden B. Dow, architect, at age 79 in Midland, Michigan
 September 1 - Arthur Herzog Jr., songwriter ("God Bless the Child" and "Don't Explain", at age 82 in Detroit
 December 30 - Willis Ward, football player and track star at Michigan, Big Ten athlete of the year in 1933, at age 71 in Detroit

Gallery of 1983 deaths

See also
 History of Michigan
 History of Detroit

References